The Century Foundation (established first as The Cooperative League and then the Twentieth Century Fund) is a progressive think tank headquartered in New York City with an office in Washington, D.C.  It was founded as a nonprofit public policy research institution on the belief that the prosperity and security of the United States depends on a mix of effective government, open democracy, and free markets. Its staff, fellows, and authors produce books, reports, papers, pamphlets, and online publications. The Foundation also hosts policy-related events and workshops for various audiences, including policy experts, journalists, college students and other academics, and the general public. It also manages several ongoing policy projects and operates a number of websites on various policy-related topics.

History 

The Century Foundation was founded in 1919 by Edward A. Filene, an American businessman, social entrepreneur, and philanthropist, under the name of The Cooperative League. The organization's mission was to act as an advisory committee for Filene in disbursing his funds in a way that could best benefit the world.

Renamed the Twentieth Century Fund in 1922, and then The Century Foundation in 1999, the Foundation has sought liberal, progressive solutions to the nation's problems.  The Fund's first executive director was Evans Clark (1928–1953), who remained on the board of trustees until his death in 1970. During the 20th century, the Foundation published many reports that informed public policy, including "Stock Market Control", a 1934 report that provided ideas for legislation enacted after the 1929 crash of the stock market; America's Needs and Resources, a 1947 report that set forth a forecast of the nation's needs, industrial production, and income over the following two decades; Jean Gottmann’s Megalopolis: The Urbanized Northeastern Seaboard of the United States; the New Federalist Papers by Nelson W. Polsby, Alan Brinkley, and Kathleen Sullivan; and Gunnar Myrdal's Asian Drama: An Inquiry into the Poverty of Nations.

The Foundation has provided information and analysis concerning Social Security since its earliest days. At the time of the inception of the Social Security program in the mid-1930s, the organization set up the Committee on Old-Age Security to look at the provisions of the Townsend Plan, a movement in this country to provide some pension protection for the elderly in the aftermath of the Great Depression. The Committee determined that the Townsend plan was unworkable, but its members continued to examine the issue of the elderly poor, and in 1937, More Security for Old Age, a report and program for action was published, providing an analysis of the newly created Social Security program. Through the ensuing years, the organization has returned to the issue frequently. More recently, beginning in the 1990s, the organization has supported numerous studies and reports, including Ensuring the Essentials by former Social Security Administrator Robert Ball (2000); Social Security Reform: Beyond the Basics, edited by Richard Leone and Greg Anrig, Jr. (1999); and Countdown to Reform: The Great Social Security Debate by Henry J. Aaron, and Robert D. Reischauer (2001).

In the wake of the 2000 election, The Century Foundation and the University of Virginia's Miller Center for Public Affairs organized The National Commission on Federal Election Reform, which was co-chaired by former presidents Jimmy Carter and Gerald Ford, and was composed of distinguished public leaders from across the political spectrum. The commission’s charge was to quickly evaluate an enormous body of research on election reform, review policy proposals, and offer a bipartisan analysis to the Congress, the administration, and the American people. It released its final report, To Assure Pride and Confidence in the Electoral Process, to Congress and the White House on July 31, 2001. In 2002, the Help America Vote Act (HAVA) was passed by the Congress and signed into law by President Bush.

The Century Foundation also has supported two task forces that examined homeland security issues after the events of September 11, 2001. The first, chaired by Richard A. Clarke, produced a report, "Defeating the Jihadists: A Blueprint for Action", in 2005. The report assessed the nation's successes and failures on homeland security and, building on the recommendations of the 9/11 Commission, offered a detailed action plan for neutralizing the international movement at the core of worldwide terrorism. The second task force, co-chaired by Richard Clarke and Randy Beers, produced the report "The Forgotten Homeland" in 2006, in which leading homeland security experts analyze the nation's most significant vulnerabilities and propose strategies to reduce them.  In 2003, The Century Foundation published "The War on Our Freedoms: Civil Liberties in an Age of Terrorism", which included essays by scholars and journalists that pointed out what is wrong with the current rush to limit civil liberties in the name of national security.

Mission 

The Century Foundation describes its mission as explaining and analyzing public issues in plain language, providing facts and opinions about the strengths and weaknesses of different policy strategies, and developing and calling attention to distinctive ideas that have been demonstrated to work as policy solutions to the nation's problems.

The Foundation covers many areas of public policy, but recently it has focused particularly on four basic challenges:

 Persistent economic inequality combined with the shift to American households of financial risks previously borne by employers and government
 Aging of the population
 Preventing and responding to terrorism while preserving civil liberties
 Restoring America's international credibility as an effective and cooperative leader in responding to global security and economic dangers

The Century Foundation produces work on issues such as Social Security and pensions, health care, education, tax and budget policy, homeland security, immigration, election reform, international terrorism, the U.S. relationship with the United Nations and other multilateral institutions, and policies toward regions such as the Middle East and East Asia.

Trustees 

The Trustees of The Century Foundation include Alicia Munnell, Peter F. Drucker Professor of Management Sciences at Boston College's Carroll School of Management and Director of the Center for Retirement Research, who was a member of Bill Clinton's Council of Economic Advisers;  Melissa Harris-Perry, political scientist and Professor of Politics at Wake Forest University; medical ethics expert Alexander Morgan Capron;  Bradley Abelow, chief operating officer of MF Global, Inc.; journalist Jonathan Alter; political scientist Jacob Hacker; former U.S. Representative George Miller (California politician); Sonal Shah (economist), AFL–CIO policy director Damon Silvers; and current president of The Century Foundation Mark Zuckerman. Emeritus Trustees include public health physician Harvey I. Sloane, M.D. and former Lieutenant Governor of New York Richard Ravitch.

The Foundation includes among its list of former trustees such notable figures as Theodore Sorensen, lawyer and speech writer for President Kennedy; Arthur M. Schlesinger, Jr. John Kenneth Galbraith, Madeleine May Kunin, Newton D. Baker, Adolf A. Berle, Jr. (and son Peter A. A. Berle), Patricia Roberts Harris, Benjamin V. Cohen, David E. Lilienthal, J. Robert Oppenheimer, Luis Muñoz Marín, Albert Shanker, Morris B. Abram, James Tobin, Jessica Mathews, James A. Leach, Max Lowenthal, Christopher Edley, historian Alan Brinkley, constitutional law scholar Kathleen Sullivan, Lewis B. Kaden, Matina S. Horner, former VP of human resources, TIAA-CREF, and former president of Radcliffe College, William Julius Wilson, Lewis P. and Linda L. Geyser University Professor at Harvard University; H. Brandt Ayers, publisher of the Anniston Star; Hodding Carter III, former president of the Knight Foundation who was an official in the Jimmy Carter administration; Joseph A. Califano, Jr., founder and chairman of the board of The National Center on Addiction and Substance Abuse (CASA) at Columbia University; Edward E. David, Jr., science adviser to president Richard M. Nixon; Brewster C. Denny, founder of the Graduate School of Public Affairs, University of Washington; Charles V. Hamilton; and Shirley Williams, co-founder of the Liberal Democrats in the United Kingdom and member of the House of Lords.

Publishing
In 2001, The Century Foundation published The Fabulous Decade: Macroeconomic Lessons from the 1990s by Janet Yellen and Alan Blinder.

See also

 Edward A. Filene
 Evans Clark

References

External links
 Official website
 Twentieth Century Fund at The Online Book Page (University of Pennsylvania)
 Century Foundation records, 1906–2010—Manuscripts and Archives Division, New York Public Library

 
1919 establishments in the United States
Organizations established in 1919
Political and economic think tanks in the United States